Ilaria Arrighetti (born 2 March 1993, in Cernusco sul Naviglio) is an Italian rugby union player who plays in the back row for Stade Rennais Rugby and the Italy women's national rugby union team.

Sporting career
Ilaria Arrighetti was born on 2 March 1993, in Cernusco sul Naviglio near to the Metropolitan City of Milan, Lombardy. She began playing rugby while at secondary school, and became captain of the mixed gender under-13 rugby union team, although she was the only female on the team.

Arrighetti made her debut for the Italy women's national rugby union team in 2012. At club level, she played for the women's side of ASD Rugby Monza 1949, until 2015 when she transferred to Stade Rennais Rugby in France. At the time, she did not speak any French. In Rennes, she lives with three other members of the Italian national team.

Arrighetti was selected in Italy's squad for the 2021 Rugby World Cup in New Zealand.

References

Living people
1993 births
People from Cernusco sul Naviglio
Italian female rugby union players
Sportspeople from the Metropolitan City of Milan